Desulfobacterium indolicum is an oval to rod-shaped, Gram-negative, non-sporing sulfate-reducing bacterium. Its type strain is In04. It is notable for its use of particular metabolic pathways, including desulfurization of diesel.

References

Further reading
Aribike, D. S., et al. "Biodesulfurization of Kerosene by Desulfobacterium indolicum." Nature and Science 6 (2008).

External links 

LPSN
WORMS entry
Type strain of Desulfobacterium indolicum at BacDive -  the Bacterial Diversity Metadatabase

Desulfobacterales
Bacteria described in 1988